1960–61 Yorkshire Cup was the fifty-third occasion on which the Yorkshire Cup competition was held.

Wakefield Trinity won the trophy by beating Huddersfield by the score of 16-10 in the final played at Headingley, Leeds, now in West Yorkshire. The attendance for this match was 17,456 and receipts were £2,937.This was Wakefield Trinity's first of two consecutive triumphs and the club's third appearance out of five in a period of nine years (which included four as cup winners and one as runner-up).

Background 

This season, there were no junior/amateur clubs taking part, no new entrants and no "leavers". Therefore, the total of entries remained the same at sixteen. This in turn resulted in no byes in the first round.

Competition and results

Round 1 
Involved 8 matches (with no byes) and 16 clubs.

Round 2 - quarterfinals 
Involved 4 matches and 8 clubs.

Round 2 - replays  
Involved 1 match and 2 clubs.

Round 3 – semifinals  
Involved 2 matches and 4 clubs.

Final

Teams and scorers 

Scoring - Try = three (3) points - Goal = two (2) points - Drop goal = two (2) points

The road to success

Notes and comments 
1 * Keighley opted to play the  match at Odsal in the  hope of a possibly larger attendance and gate receipts

2 * This was Huddersfield's 20th appearance, Wakefield's 14th - in a Yorkshire Cup final

3 * The  attendance is given as 17,629 by the official Huddersfield 1961 Yearbook but given as 17,629 by "100 Years of Rugby. The History of Wakefield Trinity 1873-1973" and 17,456 by RUGBYLEAGUEproject  and by the  Rothmans Rugby League Yearbook of 1991-92 and 1990-91

4 * The  receipts are quoted as £2,936 by "100 Years of Rugby. The History of Wakefield Trinity 1873-1973" but £2,937 in the  Rothmans Rugby League Yearbook of 1991-92 and 1990-91

5 * Headingley, Leeds, is the home ground of Leeds RLFC with a capacity of 21,000. The record attendance was  40,175 for a league match between Leeds and Bradford Northern on 21 May 1947.

General information for those unfamiliar 
The Rugby League Yorkshire Cup competition was a knock-out competition between (mainly professional) rugby league clubs from  the  county of Yorkshire. The actual area was at times increased to encompass other teams from  outside the  county such as Newcastle, Mansfield, Coventry, and even London (in the form of Acton & Willesden.

The Rugby League season always (until the onset of "Summer Rugby" in 1996) ran from around August-time through to around May-time and this competition always took place early in the season, in the Autumn, with the final taking place in (or just before) December (The only exception to this was when disruption of the fixture list was caused during, and immediately after, the two World Wars)

See also 
1960–61 Northern Rugby Football League season
Rugby league county cups

References

External links
Saints Heritage Society
1896–97 Northern Rugby Football Union season at wigan.rlfans.com
Hull&Proud Fixtures & Results 1896/1897
Widnes Vikings - One team, one passion Season In Review - 1896-97
The Northern Union at warringtonwolves.org

1960 in English rugby league
RFL Yorkshire Cup